The 2018–19 Ukrainian Cup  was the 28th annual season of Ukraine's football knockout competition. The competition started on 18 July 2018 and concluded on 15 May 2019.

All competition rounds consist of a single game with a home field advantage granted to a team from lower league. Qualification for the competition is granted to all professional clubs and finalists of the Ukrainian Amateur Cup as long as those clubs will be able to pass the season's attestation (licensing).

FC Shakhtar Donetsk is the defending winner for the last two seasons. The Donetsk club has reached the competition finals in the last eight years winning six of them. There were around 300 clubs over the history of competition.

Team allocation and schedule

Distribution

Rounds schedule 

Notes:
 Main date, when most of the games scheduled to play; an auxiliary date might be granted in case of emergencies

Competition schedule

First Preliminary round (1/64) 
In this round sixteen clubs from the Second League and both finalists of the 2017–18 Ukrainian Amateur Cup played. The draw for this round was held on 10 July 2018 at the House of Football in Kyiv. The round matches were played on 18 July 2018.

Notes:
 Match played on 17 July 2018
 Hirnyk Kryvyi Rih received a bye to the next round  after Naftovyk-Ukrnafta Okhtyrka was expelled from the PFL prior to the start of the competition.
 Match played at Kolos Stadium in Mlyniv

Second Preliminary round (1/32) 
In this round all the 16 clubs will enter from the First League, two other recently relegated clubs of the Second League, nine winners of the previous round and one team which received a bye. The draw for this round was held 20 July 2018 at the House of Football in Kyiv. The round matches were played on 22 August 2018.

Notes:
  PFC Sumy received a bye to the next round after Kobra Kharkiv withdrew from the Professional Football League of Ukraine. 
 Match postponed and was played 19 September due to unavailability of Slavutych-Arena with other future planned matches taking precedence.

Third Preliminary round (1/16) 
In this round lower placed 6 clubs from the Premier League will enter along with 14 winners of the previous round including 7 clubs from the First League and 7 clubs from the Second League. The draw for this round was held 31 August 2018 at the House of Football in Kyiv. The round matches were played on 26 September 2018.

Notes:

Round of 16 (⅛) 
In this round the other 6 clubs from the Premier League will enter along with 10 winners of the previous round including 4 more clubs from the Premier League, 2 clubs from the First League and 4 clubs from the Second League. The draw for this round was held 28 September 2018 at the House of Football in Kyiv. The round matches was played on 31 October 2018.

Notes:
 Match moved to the oblast centre of Cherkasy to accommodate a larger attendance

Quarterfinals (¼) 
In this round advanced 6 representatives from the Premier League and 2 teams from the First League. The draw for this round was held on 2 November 2018 at the House of Football in Kyiv. The round matches will be played on 3 April 2019. Due to the 2019 Ukrainian presidential election, quarterfinal games of tournament were changed to 7 April 2019.

Semifinals (½) 
In this round advanced 2 representatives from the Premier League and 2 teams from the First League. The draw for this round was held on 8 April 2019 at the House of Football in Kyiv. The round matches were originally expected to be played on 24 April 2019, but due to the 2019 Ukrainian presidential election, were scheduled to 17 April 2019.

Final

Bracket
The following is the bracket which the Ukrainian Cup resembled. Numbers in parentheses next to the match score represent the results of a penalty shoot-out.

Top goalscorers 
The competition's top ten goalscorers including qualification rounds.

Notes:

Notes

See also 
2018–19 Ukrainian Premier League
2018–19 Ukrainian First League
2018–19 Ukrainian Second League
2018–19 UEFA Europa League
2018–19 Ukrainian Amateur Cup

References

External links
 Draw results of the first preliminary stage of the 2018–19 Ukrainian Cup (Результати жеребкування першого попереднього етапу Кубку України-2018/19). Professional Football League of Ukraine. 10 July 2018
 Ukrainian Cup: official protocols of games of the first preliminary stage of the competitions (Кубок України: офіційні протоколи матчів першого попереднього етапу змагань). Football Federation of Ukraine. 19 July 2018

Cup
Ukrainian Cup
Ukrainian Cup seasons